Bruno Bonifacio (born 2 November 1994) is a Brazilian racing driver.

Career

Karting
Born in São Paulo, Bonifacio entered karting in 2006, when he took the titles in the Junior Menor class of the Petrobras Cup and Brazilian Kart Cup. Bonifacio raced in karting until the end of 2010, when he became a champion in the São Paulo Cup.

Formula 3 Sudamericana
Bonifacio made his début in single-seaters in 2011, taking part in the Light Class of the local Formula 3 Sudamericana championship for Cesário Fórmula Jr. He dominated the championship and clinched the title, winning 12 from 14 races.

Formula Abarth
Also in 2011, Bonifacio moved in Europe, joining the Formula Abarth series for Prema Powerteam. He finished fourteenth in the Italian Series standings with two point-scoring finishes, while in the European Series he finished fifteenth with four podiums. He contested a sophomore campaign with the same team in 2012, improving to third in European Series and to fifth in Italian Series.

Formula Renault
Bonifacio remained with Prema, as they moved to the 2-litre Formula Renault machinery to compete in the final rounds of Formula Renault 2.0 Alps and Formula Renault 2.0 NEC at the end of 2012. For 2013, Bonifacio had full-time campaigns in both Formula Renault 2.0 Alps and the Eurocup Formula Renault 2.0, staying with Prema. He took a podium finish at Spa and another three point-scoring finishes, to end the season fifteenth. In the Alps series, he scored three wins and finished third, behind teammates Antonio Fuoco and Luca Ghiotto.

Bonifacio stayed for another season with Prema in 2014. He improved to fifth position in the standings, achieving his first Eurocup win at Spa.

Racing record

Career summary

† As Bonifacio was a guest driver, he was ineligible to score points.

Complete Formula Renault 3.5 Series results
(key) (Races in bold indicate pole position) (Races in italics indicate fastest lap)

Complete European Le Mans Series results

References

External links

1994 births
Living people
Racing drivers from São Paulo
Brazilian racing drivers
Formula 3 Sudamericana drivers
Formula Abarth drivers
Formula Renault 2.0 NEC drivers
Formula Renault Eurocup drivers
Formula Renault 2.0 Alps drivers
World Series Formula V8 3.5 drivers
Prema Powerteam drivers
Draco Racing drivers
Murphy Prototypes drivers
European Le Mans Series drivers